Anke Hoeffler is a German economist and political scientist who is known for her work on social causes of morbidity and mortality.

Life 
Hoeffler studied in Würzburg (Diploma in Economics) and London (Birkbeck College, Master's degree in Economics) and received her PhD from Oxford University (1999). Following her Ph.D., she was a research officer at the Centre for the Study of African Economies at St Antony's College, Oxford. In 2018, she was awarded a Humboldt Professorship at the University of Konstanz, where she has established the Chair of Development Research at the department of Political Science and Public Administration.

Research 
Hoeffler researches the political economy of developing countries, in particular the causes and consequences of violence. In her work with Paul Collier, she argues, that the drivers of civil war are not so much political and religious grievances, but economic opportunities (greed and grievance approach). She has also worked on democracy in countries whose primary economic driver is oil.

Selected publications

References

External links 
 Chair of Development Research, University of Konstanz
 

Living people
Economists
Women economists
Political scientists
University of Würzburg alumni